Jeong San (born 10 February 1989) is a South Korean footballer who plays as a goalkeeper for Daejeon Hana Citizen.

References

External links 
 

1989 births
Living people
Association football goalkeepers
South Korean footballers
Gangwon FC players
Seongnam FC players
Ulsan Hyundai FC players
K League 1 players